Alina Vitaliyivna Shynkarenko (born 14 November 1998) is a Ukrainian synchronised swimmer. She is World Championships medalist.

Career
Shynkarenko won two bronze medals at the inaugural European Games where she was third in team and combination competitions.

At the 2017 World Aquatics Championships Shynkarenko won silver in the combination event.

References

1998 births
Living people
Ukrainian synchronized swimmers
World Aquatics Championships medalists in synchronised swimming
Synchronized swimmers at the 2017 World Aquatics Championships
Artistic swimmers at the 2019 World Aquatics Championships
European Aquatics Championships medalists in synchronised swimming
European Championships (multi-sport event) silver medalists
European Games medalists in synchronised swimming
European Games bronze medalists for Ukraine
Synchronised swimmers at the 2015 European Games
Sportspeople from Donetsk
Synchronized swimmers at the 2020 Summer Olympics
Olympic synchronized swimmers of Ukraine
Olympic bronze medalists for Ukraine
Olympic medalists in synchronized swimming
Medalists at the 2020 Summer Olympics
21st-century Ukrainian women